Emma Meyer (1859–1921) was a Danish landscape painter.

Emma Meyer may also refer to:
 Emma Meyer (field hockey), member of the Australia women's national field hockey squad

See also

 Emma Clara Schweer (1896–2001), née Meier, American tax collector